André Vercruysse was a Belgian cyclist. He won the bronze medal in the Team road race in the 1920 Summer Olympics.

References

External links
 
 

Belgian male cyclists
Olympic cyclists of Belgium
Olympic bronze medalists for Belgium
Cyclists at the 1920 Summer Olympics
Olympic medalists in cycling
Place of birth missing
Year of birth missing
Year of death missing
Medalists at the 1920 Summer Olympics